Joseph Lewis Stackpole (March 20, 1838 – January 2, 1904) was a Member of the Board of General Appraisers.

Education and career

Stackpole was born on March 20, 1838, in Boston, Massachusetts. He received a Bachelor of Arts degree in 1857 from Harvard University. He received a Bachelor of Laws in 1859 from Harvard Law School. He worked in private practice in Boston from 1860 to 1861, 1865 to 1870 and 1876 to 1890. He served as a Lieutenant Colonel and judge advocate in the United States Army from 1861 to 1865. He served as City Solicitor for Boston from 1870 to 1876.

Federal judicial service

Stackpole was nominated by President Benjamin Harrison on July 17, 1890, to the Board of General Appraisers, to a new seat created by 26 Stat. 131. He was confirmed by the United States Senate on July 18, 1890, and received his commission on July 22, 1890. His service terminated on December 5, 1890, due to his resignation. He was succeeded by Wilbur Fisk Lunt.

Death

Stackpole died on January 2, 1904, in Boston.

References

Sources
 

1838 births
1904 deaths
Lawyers from Boston
Harvard Law School alumni
Massachusetts lawyers
Members of the Board of General Appraisers
United States Article I federal judges appointed by Benjamin Harrison
19th-century American judges